Auenheim is a former commune in the Bas-Rhin department in the Grand Est region of north-eastern France. On 1 January 2019, it was merged into the new commune Rountzenheim-Auenheim.

The inhabitants of the commune are known as Auenheimois or Auenheimoises.

Geography
Auenheim is located some 15 km east of Haguenau and 13 km north-east of Bischwiller. Access to the commune is by the road D468 from Rœschwoog in the north-east which passes through the north of the commune and the village before continuing to Stattmatten in the south. The D463 branches off the D468 in the north of the commune and goes west to Rountzenheim. The TER Strasbourg-Lauterbourg railway passes through the village and there is a station in the commune which, however, appears to be disused. There is a belt of forest through the centre of the commune (the Biergrund) and a large forest in the south-east of the commune (the Unterwald) with substantial urbanisation in the north-west of the commune with the rest farmland.

The Moder river comes from the south and passes through the south-west then the centre of the commune before forming half of the eastern border and continuing east to join the Rhine at Neuhaeusel. There is also a large reservoir in the north of the commune.

Neighbouring communes and villages

Toponymy
According to the Cassini Map of 1750 Auen- was spelt Augenheim which in modern German would mean "of the eye" + -heim meaning "hamlet or village".

The suffix -heim indicates a Frankish origin since before the first creation of villages by the Alemanni. -heim signified a "hamlet" or a group of houses in French from which came the Alemannic hüs from which comes haus which is "house" in German.

In 1359 the village was called Oweheim and in 1596 it was Awenheim''.

Heraldry

Administration

List of Successive Mayors

Demography
In 2012 the commune had 898 inhabitants.

Culture and heritage

Civil heritage
The commune has a number of buildings and sites that are registered as historical monuments:
A House at 1 Rue de l'Eglise (17th century)
A Farmhouse at 2 Rue des Oies (1930)
The Town Hall and School at Rue principale (1850)
A Farmhouse at 23 Rue principale (1822)
A Farmhouse at 24 Rue principale (18th century)
A House at 45 Rue principale (18th century)
A Farmhouse at 47 Rue principale (18th century)
Houses and Farms

One structure is registered as an historical object:
The War Memorial (20th century)

The Maginot Line

Auenheim Blockhouse north

An isolated infantry Blockhouse, simple flank built in 1932. It housed an officer, a non-commissioned officer and 20 enlisted men.
Floor dimensions: 25x15 metres;
Height: 7.50 metres;
Thickness of structural work: 2 metres;
Exposed concrete slab: 2.25 m thick walls;
Rear walls: 1 m thick.
Armament: one 37 mm cannon, 3 Reibel machine guns, 5 FM, 2 50 mm mortars, grenade launcher chutes.
History: From 1939 to 1940 the blockhouse was held by a detachment of the 68th Fortress Infantry Regiment who resisted German pressure until 1 July 1940, 6 days after the Armistice came into effect (25 June 1940).

Auenheim Blockhouse south

An isolated infantry Blockhouse, simple flank built in 1932. It housed an officer, a non-commissioned officer and 20 enlisted men.
Floor dimensions: 25x15 metres;
Height: 7.50 metres;
Thickness of structural work: 2 metres;
Exposed concrete slab: 2.25 m thick walls;
Rear walls: 1 m thick.
Armament: one 37 mm Cannon, 3 Reibel machine guns, 5 FM, 2 50 mm mortars, grenade launcher chutes.
History: From 1939 to 1940 the blockhouse was held by a detachment of the 68th Fortress Infantry Regiment who resisted German pressure until 1 July 1940, 6 days after the Armistice came into effect (25 June 1940).

Blockhouse 1
1 25 mm antitank gun, 1 Hotchkiss machine gun

Blockhouse 2
1 25 mm antitank gun.

Blockhouse 3
1 25 mm antitank gun.

Religious heritage
The commune has one religious site that is registered as a historical monument:
A Cemetery (19th century) The Cemetery contains two items that are registered as historical objects:
The Movable Objects in the Cemetery
The Tomb of Hélène Kuhry (1918)

Notable people linked to the commune
Henri Loux, born at Auenheim in 1873 and died at Strasbourg in 1907. An illustrator of the countryside and village scenes on a range of tableware called "Obernai".

See also
Communes of the Bas-Rhin department

References

External links
Auenheim Commune website 
Auenheim on the 1750 Cassini Map

Former communes of Bas-Rhin
Populated places disestablished in 2019